Whit Taylor may refer to:

 Whit Taylor (American football)
 Whit Taylor (cartoonist)